Pino Torinese is a comune (municipality) in the Metropolitan City of Turin in the Italian region Piedmont, located about  southeast of Turin.

Pino Torinese borders the following municipalities: Turin, Baldissero Torinese, Chieri, Pecetto Torinese, and Cambiano.

It is the site of the Observatory of Turin, founded in 1759.

The Associazione Cultura Giapponese di Torino had its offices in Pino Torinese. It operates a Japanese weekend school.

References

External links
 Official website